This is a list of commercial banks in Sierra Leone

 Commercial banks
 Sierra Leone Commercial Bank 
 Standard Chartered Bank (Sierra Leone)
 Rokel Commercial Bank
 Guaranty Trust Bank (Sierra Leone)
 Union Trust Bank
 First International Bank
 First Bank of Nigeria, formerly International Commercial Bank
 Access Bank Sierra Leone
 Ecobank
 Skye Bank
 United Bank for Africa 
 Zenith Bank
 Keystone Bank

 Community banks
 Marampa Masimera Community Bank 
 Mattru Community Bank
 Segbwema Community Bank
 Yoni Community Bank

See also
 List of banks in Africa
 Banking in Sierra Leone
 Bank of Sierra Leone
 Economy of Sierra Leone
 List of companies based in Sierra Leone

References

External links
 Website of Central Bank of Sierra Leone

 
Banks
Sierra Leone
Sierra Leone